Tibor Bodnár (31 March 1955 – 4 February 2022) was a Hungarian sports shooter. He competed at the 1976 Summer Olympics and the 1980 Summer Olympics. He died in February 2022, at the age of 66.

References

External links
 

1955 births
2022 deaths
Hungarian male sport shooters
Olympic shooters of Hungary
Shooters at the 1976 Summer Olympics
Shooters at the 1980 Summer Olympics
Sport shooters from Budapest